Freak 'n' Roll ...Into the Fog: The Black Crowes All Join Hands, The Fillmore, San Francisco is a live concert album released on DVD, CD and Blu-ray by American southern rock band The Black Crowes in 2006. 
Filmed at The Fillmore in August 2005, this performance was the second of a five-night stand at the theater. The set features guests Dave Ellis and the Left Coast Horns.

All three versions have the same track list, with the CD version being split over two discs between "Sunday Night Buttermilk Waltz" and "Cursed Diamond".  They present the August 6, 2005 show in its entirety with one omission: the Rolling Stones cover "Loving Cup" was performed between "Welcome To The Goodtimes" and "Jealous Again", though the copies of the CD sold at Wal-Mart stores included access to a digital download of the omitted song.

Track listing
All songs written by Chris Robinson and Rich Robinson, except where noted.

(Only) Halfway to Everywhere – 8:29
Sting Me – 4:41
No Speak No Slave – 5:31
Soul Singing – 9:46
Welcome to the Goodtimes – 4:02
Jealous Again – 5:04
Space Captain (Matthew Moore) – 4:43
My Morning Song – 13:49
Sunday Night Buttermilk Waltz – 5:06
Cursed Diamond – 7:24
She Talks to Angels – 6:10
Wiser Time – 7:14
Non Fiction – 10:18
Seeing Things – 7:16
Hard to Handle (Allen Jones, Alvertis Isbell, Otis Redding) – 8:27
Let Me Share the Ride – 9:24
Mellow Down Easy (Willie Dixon) – 4:35
Remedy – 5:39
The Night They Drove Old Dixie Down (Robbie Robertson) – 6:16

Personnel
Chris Robinson – vocals, harmonica, acoustic guitar
Rich Robinson – guitar, vocals
Marc Ford – guitar, vocals
Steve Gorman – drums, percussion
Sven Pipien – bass
Ed Hawrysch – keyboards
Mona Lisa Young – backing vocals
Charity White – backing vocals

Left Coast Horns
David Ellis – tenor sax
Gavin Distasi – trumpet
Josh Marshall – alto sax
Marty Wehner – trombone

References

The Black Crowes live albums
2006 live albums
Live video albums
2006 video albums